Liam Adams may refer to:

Liam Adams (runner) (born 1986), Australian runner
an Irish rapist, see Public Prosecution Service of Northern Ireland v. Liam Adams
a comic book character, see Freshmen (comics)